Hollywood District may refer to:

 Hollywood, Portland, Oregon, a neighborhood of Portland, Oregon
 Hollywood Historic District (Homewood, Alabama)
 Hollywood, Los Angeles, California, a neighborhood
 Hollywood Boulevard Commercial and Entertainment District, Los Angeles, California
 Hollywood Boulevard Historic Business District, Hollywood, Florida

See also
 Hollywood (disambiguation)
 Hollywood Terrace Historic District, a district listed on the National Register of Historic Places listings in Fayette County, Kentucky
 Little Hollywood Historic District, Hartford, Connecticut